A relief army had the task of relieving or freeing a besieged city, town, fortress or castle.

Often relief had to be sought by sending a messenger out through the siege lines to deliver a request for help from allies or friendly forces. Well-known examples include:

 Gallic Wars, see Caesar de bello Gallico and Vercingetorix, 52 B. C. or the Battle of Alesia
 Siege of Paris (885–86)
 Fall of Constantinople – here the relieving fleet arrived too late.
 Second Turkish Siege of Vienna (1683)

Military terminology